James Lovell may refer to:

 James Lovell (politician) (1736–1814), Continental Congress delegate from Massachusetts
 James Lovell (sculptor) (died 1778), English sculptor
 Jim Lovell (born 1928), U.S. astronaut of Apollo 8 and commander of Apollo 13
 Jim Lovell (British Army soldier) (1899–2004), last surviving decorated 'Tommy' of the First World War

See also
 Jim Leavelle, Dallas Police Department homicide detective